Nordrum is a Norwegian surname. Notable people with the surname include: 

  (born 1987), Norwegian actor
 Lars Nordrum (1921–1973), Norwegian actor
 Siv Nordrum (1958–2021), Norwegian journalist and politician

Norwegian-language surnames